Florrie (born 1988) is an English pop singer-songwriter, drummer and model.

Florrie is also a nickname for Florence or Flora and may refer to:

People
Florrie Burke (1918–1995), Irish footballer
Florrie R. Burke, human rights advocate
Lady Florence Dixie (1855–1905), British traveller, war correspondent, writer and feminist
 Florrie Dugger, American child actress in the 1976 film Bugsy Malone
 Florrie Evans (1884–1967), Welsh revivalist and missionary
 Florrie Fisher (c. 1918–1972), American speaker, inspiration for Strangers with Candy character Jerri Blank 
 Florrie Forde (1875–1940), Australian popular singer and entertainer

Fictional characters
Florrie "Flo" Capp, wife of the title character in Andy Capp, a British comic strip
Florrie Lindley, a former Coronation Street character
Florrie, a character in the British TV series Fimbles

See also
The Florence Institute, a school in Liverpool, England, known colloquially as "The Florrie"

Hypocorisms
Feminine given names